Nicolaas George Wijnand Henri Beeger (1884, in Utrecht – 1965, in Amsterdam) was a Dutch mathematician. His 1916 doctorate was on Dirichlet series. He worked for most of his life as a teacher, working on mathematics papers in his spare evenings. After his retirement as a teacher at 65, he began corresponding with many contemporary mathematicians and dedicated himself to his work. Tilburg University still hold biennial lectures entitled the Beeger lectures in his honour.

He is known for having proved that 3511 is a Wieferich prime in 1922  and for introducing the term Carmichael number in 1950.

Works
   (N. G. W. H. Beeger ed.), Jakob Philipp Kulik, Luigi Poletti, R. J. Porter, Liste des nombres premiers du onzième million: (plus précisément de 10.006.741 à 10.999.997), Association française pour l'avancement des sciences, Ed. "Werto,", 1951

References

External links
 
 Tilburg University information

1884 births
1965 deaths
Politicians from Utrecht (city)
20th-century Dutch mathematicians